The 1957 SMU Mustangs football team represented Southern Methodist University (SMU) as a member of the Southwest Conference (SWC) during the 1957 NCAA University Division football season. Led by first-year head coach Bill Meek, the Mustangs compiled an overall record of 4–5–1 with a conference mark of 3–3, placing fourth in the SWC.

Schedule

References

SMU
SMU Mustangs football seasons
SMU Mustangs football